Ian Hinks (born 17 April 1937) is a former  Australian rules footballer who played with Hawthorn in the Victorian Football League (VFL).

Notes

External links 

Living people
1937 births
Australian rules footballers from Victoria (Australia)
Hawthorn Football Club players